LA-2 is a constituency of Azad Kashmir Legislative Assembly which is currently represented by the Chaudhry Abdul Majid of Pakistan Peoples Party. It covers the area of Chakswari in Mirpur District of Azad Kashmir, Pakistan.

Election 2016

elections were held in this constituency on 21 July 2016.

Mirpur District
Azad Kashmir Legislative Assembly constituencies